Every Second Counts can refer to:

Every Second Counts (video parodies), a 2017 video parody meme mocking U.S. President Donald Trump
Every Second Counts (UK game show)
Every Second Counts (US game show)
Every Second Counts (book), the autobiography of Lance Armstrong
Every Second Counts (album), a 2006 album by the Plain White T's
"Every Second Counts", a song by White Town from Peek & Poke